Primorsky District is the name of several administrative and municipal districts in Russia. The name literally means "near the sea".

Districts of the federal subjects
Primorsky District, Arkhangelsk Oblast, an administrative and municipal district of Arkhangelsk Oblast
Primorsky District, Saint Petersburg, an administrative district of the federal city of St. Petersburg

City divisions

Primorsky City District, Novorossiysk, a city district of Novorossiysk, a city in Krasnodar Krai

Former districts
Primorsky District, Leningrad Oblast, an administrative district of Leningrad Oblast between 1948 and 1954 (previously known as Koyvistovsky District).

See also
Primorsky (disambiguation)
Primorsky Military District

References